The 1975 World Championship Tennis circuit was one of the two rival professional male tennis circuits of 1975. It was organized by World Championship Tennis (WCT). The 1975 circuit divided the players in three groups, Red, Blue and Green who played 24 tournaments in 12 countries. The first tournament, U.S. Professional Indoor Championships, was a combined event as was the season's final which was played in Dallas by the eight best performers and was won by American Arthur Ashe who defeated Björn Borg from Sweden in four sets.

Additionally there were three special non–ranking events; the CBS Classic (Puerto Rico, 13–19 January), the Aetna World Cup team contest between Australia and America (Hartford, 6–9 March) and the Rothmans International Trophy an eight-nation contest between 16 players (London, 4–8 March).

The total prize money for the 1975 WCT circuit was $2,068,500 which included $100,000 bonus money.

Overview

Schedule
This is the complete schedule of events on the 1975 WCT circuit, with player progression documented until the quarterfinals stage.

January

February

March

April

May

Standings

Blue group

Green group

Red group

* Qualified for the WCT Finals. The best two players from each group qualified plus the next two players with the highest points total.

See also
 1975 Grand Prix circuit
 1975 USLTA-IPA Indoor Circuit

References

External links
 ATP 1975 results archive

 
World Championship Tennis circuit seasons
World Championship Tennis